Seok Pass, Söök Pass or Suyak Pass is a mountain pass in the Terskey Alatau mountain range of Kyrgyzstan. Its elevation of  makes it the third highest mountain pass in Kyrgyzstan after Bedel Pass and Kyzylart Pass, and the highest one that is not on a border. It connects the Ala-Bel plateau, where the Kumtor Gold Mine is located, to the upper Naryn River valley.

Seok Pass is situated on the ancient Silk Road route connecting Barskon on Lake Issyk-Kul and Kashgar in China's Xinjiang province across the Tian Shan mountains. It is one of three major passes on this route, located between Barskoon Pass (elevation ) and Bedel Pass (elevation ). As the border road over Bedel Pass to China has remained closed since Soviet times, Seok Pass is nowadays significant mainly as a strategic gateway on the A364 road to the southeastern high mountain desert areas of Kyrgyzstan along the Chinese border, and to the border posts at Kara-Say and Ak-Shyrak.

The name means "Bone Pass" in Kyrgyz, a reference to the Urkun incident of 1916, when thousands of Kyrgyz died attempting to cross the border into China, fleeing from Tsarist Russian forces.

The condition of the pass can be seen using Google Maps satellite imagery.

References
Tian-Shan entry in 1911 Encyclopædia Britannica (there called "Suka Pass")
Dangerous Roads

Mountain passes of Kyrgyzstan